Salem Mubarak Al-Yami (born February 9, 1982) is a Saudi Arabian sprinter specializing in the 100 metres.

He won a silver medal at the 2000 World Junior Championships, bronze medals at the 2002 and 2003 Asian Championships, and gold medals at the 2005 Islamic Solidarity Games as well as the 2001 and 2003 Pan Arab Championships.

Participating in the 2004 Summer Olympics, he achieved fourth place in his 100 metres heat, narrowly failing to qualify for the second round.

Competition record

References

1982 births
Living people
Saudi Arabian male sprinters
Athletes (track and field) at the 2000 Summer Olympics
Athletes (track and field) at the 2004 Summer Olympics
Olympic athletes of Saudi Arabia
Athletes (track and field) at the 2002 Asian Games
Athletes (track and field) at the 2006 Asian Games
Asian Games competitors for Saudi Arabia
Islamic Solidarity Games competitors for Saudi Arabia
Islamic Solidarity Games medalists in athletics
20th-century Saudi Arabian people
21st-century Saudi Arabian people